Matija Zmajević (also Matej Zmajević; ; ; January 6, 1680 – August 23, 1735) was an admiral of the Russian Baltic Fleet and the shipbuilder of Tsar Peter the Great, building a fleet in Voronezh.

Early life
He was born in Perast in 1680 (at the time in Venetian Albania, now Montenegro). His uncle Andrija Zmajević, was an archbishop of Roman Catholic Archdiocese of Bar and a poet. He was also a primate of Serbia. The family was in conflict with the Bujović, another family from Perast. After Duke Vicko Bujović was killed, Matija left Perast as he was accused of being involved in his death. He escaped to the Republic of Ragusa (Dubrovnik) and then to Istanbul, where he found refuge with Russian ambassador Peter Tolstoy. Zmajević had known Tolstoy since a 1698 training trip the latter took to Perast. In 1712, Tolstoy sent him with a recommendation to Peter I.

Military career
Impressed with Zmajević's education and maritime skills, the Tsar accepted him into military service and sent him to Sankt Petersburg, where he became commodore captain and further rose in rank.

Zmajević had great success in maritime battles against Sweden, against whom Russia fought the Great Northern War for supremacy on Baltic Sea. In 1714, as head of the Tsar's Baltic fleet, he achieved a victory in the Battle of Gangut for which he received the war flag of the Russian fleet. In 1719, he was promoted to rear admiral and his fleet won the last naval battle of the Great Northern War, forcing the Swedes to sign the Peace Treaty of Nystad.

He was subsequently promoted to the rank of vice admiral and put in charge for building the river fleet of the Don. In 1725, he was given the honor of carrying the emperor's crown at the funeral of Peter the Great. Tsar's successor, Catherine I of Russia, decorated Zmajević with the Order of Alexander Nevsky. In 1727, he was awarded the ultimate rank of admiral.

After the death of Catherine I in 1727, Zmajević was accused of embezzlement and sentenced to death by a court-martial. He was reprieved at the last minute and relegated to the post of governor of the Astrakhan area with the rank of vice-admiral, where he spent last years of his life. He worked on establishment of the Black Sea Fleet, which would play a significant role in Russian expansion to the south after his death.

Zmajević made numerous donations to his hometown Perast and Boka Kotorska. He was buried with military honors in the Catholic Church of Saint Ludvig in Moscow.

Legacy

The Croatian Encyclopedia describes him as a 'Croatian sailor and Russian admiral'. He was depicted on a Montenegrin stamp in 2012.

See also
 Krsto Zmajević
 Marko Ivanovich Voinovich
 Vicko Zmajević
 Marko Ivelich
 Nikolai Kuznetsov
 Nikolai Dimitrievich Dabić

References

Sources
 
 

1680 births
1735 deaths
People from Perast
Imperial Russian Navy admirals
Russian military personnel of the Great Northern War